Wu Chia-ying (born October 25, 1992) is a Taiwanese sport shooter. She is currently playing for the Chinese Taipei team at the 2020 Tokyo Olympic Games. She competed at the 2016 Summer Olympics in the women's 25 metre pistol event, in which she placed 27th, and the women's 10 metre air pistol event, in which she placed 19th.

References

1992 births
Living people
ISSF pistol shooters
Taiwanese female sport shooters
Olympic shooters of Taiwan
Shooters at the 2016 Summer Olympics
Universiade medalists in shooting
Asian Games medalists in shooting
Asian Games silver medalists for Chinese Taipei
Medalists at the 2014 Asian Games
Shooters at the 2014 Asian Games
Shooters at the 2018 Asian Games
Universiade bronze medalists for Chinese Taipei
Medalists at the 2015 Summer Universiade
Shooters at the 2020 Summer Olympics